The 2007 Central League Climax Series (CLCS) consisted of two consecutive series of baseball games, in which Stage 1 was a best-of-three series and Stage 2 was a best-of-five. The winner of the series advanced to the 2007 Japan Series, where they competed against the 2007 Pacific League Climax Series (PLCS) winner. The top three regular-season finishers played in the two series. The CLCS began with the first game of Stage 1 on October 13 and ended with the final game of Stage 2 on October 20.

First stage

Summary

Game 1

Game 2

Second stage

Summary

Game 1

Game 2

Game 3

References

Climax Series
Central League Climax Series